Richi Puspita Dili (born 10 July 1989) is an Indonesian doubles specialist badminton player. She won the girls' doubles title at the 2007 Asian Junior Championships.

Career 
Richi Puspita Dili was a member of SGS PLN Bandung club. In 2007, she won the girls' doubles title at the Asian Junior Championships partnered with Debby Susanto. She educated at the Trisakti University, and represented Indonesia in the 2007 Summer Universiade by winning a bronze medal in the team event, and at the 2008 World University Championships, also winning a bronze in the mixed doubles with Bona Septano.

In 2015, she won a Grand Prix Gold title in Syed Modi International tournament partnered with Riky Widianto.

Achievements

Southeast Asian Games 
Mixed doubles

World University Championships 
Mixed doubles

Asian Junior Championships 
Girls' doubles

BWF Superseries (2 runners-up) 
The BWF Superseries, which was launched on 14 December 2006 and implemented in 2007, was a series of elite badminton tournaments, sanctioned by the Badminton World Federation (BWF). BWF Superseries levels were Superseries and Superseries Premier. A season of Superseries consisted of twelve tournaments around the world that had been introduced since 2011. Successful players were invited to the Superseries Finals, which were held at the end of each year.

Mixed doubles

  BWF Superseries Finals tournament
  BWF Superseries Premier tournament
  BWF Superseries tournament

BWF Grand Prix (3 titles, 2 runners-up) 
The BWF Grand Prix had two levels, the Grand Prix and Grand Prix Gold. It was a series of badminton tournaments sanctioned by the Badminton World Federation (BWF) and played between 2007 and 2017.

Mixed doubles

 BWF Grand Prix Gold tournament
 BWF Grand Prix tournament

BWF International Challenge/Series 
Women's doubles

Mixed doubles

  BWF International Challenge tournament
  BWF International Series tournament

Performance timeline

Indonesian team 
 Junior level

 Senior level

Individual competitions 
 Junior level

 Senior level

References

External links 

1989 births
Living people
People from Sleman Regency
Sportspeople from Special Region of Yogyakarta
Indonesian female badminton players
Competitors at the 2013 Southeast Asian Games
Competitors at the 2015 Southeast Asian Games
Southeast Asian Games bronze medalists for Indonesia
Southeast Asian Games medalists in badminton
Universiade bronze medalists for Indonesia
Universiade medalists in badminton
Medalists at the 2007 Summer Universiade
21st-century Indonesian women
20th-century Indonesian women